Mount Feldkotter is a mountain in Antarctica,  high, standing  south of Gambacorta Peak in the southern Neptune Range, Pensacola Mountains, Antarctica. It was mapped by the United States Geological Survey from surveys and U.S. Navy air photos, 1956–66, and was named by the Advisory Committee on Antarctic Names for Henry H.J. Feldkotter, an aviation electrician at Ellsworth Station during the winter of 1958.

References 

Mountains of Queen Elizabeth Land
Pensacola Mountains